Petrit Vasili is an Albanian politician. He was the chairman of Socialist Movement for Integration party and minister of health in the cabinet of Sali Berisha.

References

Living people
Socialist Movement for Integration politicians
Justice ministers of Albania
Government ministers of Albania
Health ministers of Albania
Year of birth missing (living people)